There are three small primary schools on the Chatham Islands, a New Zealand archipelago of about ten islands lying  to the east of Christchurch. 

The rolls given here are those provided by the Ministry of Education, based on figures from

References
Specific

General
Te Kete Ipurangi Ministry of Education website
ERO school and early childhood education reports Education Review Office
Decile change 2007 to 2008 for state & state integrated schools

Chatham Islands
Chatham Islands